Snap-on Industrial Brands, historically the J.H. Williams Tool Group, is a division of American hand tool manufacturer Snap-on that makes and distributes tools to industrial markets. In addition to the Williams brand from which it originated, the group includes Bahco and CDI Torque Products.

History 

In 1882, James Harvey Williams and Matthew Diamond founded Williams & Diamond in Flushing, Queens, a drop forging business. The business was relocated to Brooklyn in 1884 and took the name J.H. Williams & Co in 1887. The company was one of the first to offer mass-produced drop-forged hand tools.  A second factory was opened in Buffalo, New York in 1914 (now the site of General Motors' Tonawanda Engine plant).

The company was acquired by Snap-on in 1993, and it was officially renamed Snap-on Industrial Brands in 2011.

Gallery

References

External links 

 
 Alloy Artifacts: "J.H. Williams, The SuperCompany"
 "Vanished Tool Makers: J.H. Williams & Company, Brooklyn & Buffalo, New York"
 "James H. Williams, Drop Forging"
 J.H. Williams Tool Catalog No. 401—A tool catalog, believed to be from the late 1950s.

Tool manufacturing companies of the United States
Companies based in Queens, New York
Flushing, Queens